is an underground metro station on the Sendai Subway Nanboku Line in Izumi-ku, Sendai, Miyagi Prefecture, Japan.

Lines
Kuromatsu Station is on the Sendai Subway Nanboku Line and is located 2.5 rail kilometers from the terminus of the line at Izumi-Chūō Station.

Station layout
Kuromatsu Station is an underground station with a single island platform serving two tracks.

Platforms

History
Kuromatsu Station was opened on 15 July 1987. Operations were suspended from 11 March 2011 to 29 April 2012 due to damage sustained by the 2011 Tōhoku earthquake and tsunami.

Passenger statistics
In fiscal 2015, the station was used by an average of 3,987 passengers daily.

Surrounding area
Izumi-Kuromatsu Post Office

References

External links

 

Railway stations in Miyagi Prefecture
Sendai Subway Namboku Line
Railway stations in Japan opened in 1987